W. E. "Ted" Arnold was a college football player and referee. Arnold was a running back for Mike Donahue's Auburn Tigers football team from 1911 to 1914. In 1913, he showed he could handle quarterback duties, allowing Kirk Newell to move to his more natural position at halfback. He was from Jacksonville. He was once on the Gator Bowl executive committee. He officiated the 1940 Sugar Bowl. He was involved with St. Luke's Hospital in Jacksonville.

References

Auburn Tigers football players
American football quarterbacks
American football officials
Sportspeople from Jacksonville, Florida